WJJH (96.7 FM) is an American radio station broadcasting a classic rock format as "Real Rock J96." Licensed to Ashland, Wisconsin, United States, the station is currently owned by Heartland Communications Group, LLC, and features programming from ABC Radio, CBS Radio and Westwood One. It serves Ashland and Bayfield counties.

Studio and transmitter are located at 2320 Ellis Avenue in Ashland, with its local sister stations.

History
The station was assigned call sign WATW-FM on December 6, 1982.  On January 16, 1985, the station changed its call sign to the current WJJH.  Prior to the July 2017 change to classic rock, its previous format was active rock, and before the 2010 change to active rock, its previous format was satellite-based classic rock.

References

External links

JJH
Classic rock radio stations in the United States